Such Sweet Thunder is a Duke Ellington album, released in 1957. The record is a twelve-part suite based on the work of William Shakespeare.

Background
In August 1956, Duke Ellington and his orchestra were in Canada, performing in the same city as the ongoing Stratford Shakespearean Festival. Curious, Ellington and his longtime composer/arranger Billy Strayhorn talked to festival staffers, and Ellington soon announced his next album project would be a conceptual piece, paying tribute to Shakespeare's varied works with appropriate jazz compositions. In addition to the Such Sweet Thunder album, he promised the entire suite would be performed at the 1957 edition of the festival. Ellington and Strayhorn began building a home library of Shakespeare, seeking out Shakespeare experts, and reading through the canon during orchestra downtime. The title comes from Act IV scene i of A Midsummer Night's Dream, where Hippolyta says: "I never heard / So musical a discord, such sweet thunder."

The suite that would constitute Such Sweet Thunder was written in just under three weeks and recorded in early 1957. Although most of the compositions were created for the suite in conjunction with Strayhorn, a few were versions of older Strayhorn songs that were reworked and re-titled for the collection.

Track listing
All songs written by Duke Ellington and Billy Strayhorn, except where noted.

 "Such Sweet Thunder {Cleo}" – 3:22
 "Sonnet for Caesar" – 3:00
 "Sonnet to Hank Cinq" – 1:24
 "Lady Mac" – 3:41
 "Sonnet in Search of a Moor" – 2:22
 "The Telecasters" – 3:05
 "Up and Down, Up and Down (I Will Lead Them Up and Down)  {Puck}" – 3:09
 "Sonnet for Sister Kate" – 2:24
 "The Star-Crossed Lovers" (Also known as "Pretty Girl") – 4:00
 "Madness in Great Ones {Hamlet}" – 3:26
 "Half the Fun" (Also known as "Lately") – 4:19
 "Circle of Fourths" – 1:45

Bonus tracks
<LI>"The Star-Crossed Lovers" (Also known as "Pretty Girl") (stereo LP master) – 4:15
<LI>"Circle of Fourths" (stereo LP master) – 1:47
<LI>"Suburban Beauty" (Ellington) – 2:56
<LI>"A-Flat Minor" (Ellington) – 2:33
<LI>"Café au Lait" – 2:49
<LI>"Half the Fun" (Alternate take) – 4:08
<LI>"Suburban Beauty" (Alternate take) (Ellington) – 2:56
<LI>"A-Flat Minor" (Outtake) (Ellington) – 3:49
<LI>"Café au Lait" – 6:21
<LI>"Pretty Girl" (Also known as the "Star-Crossed Lovers") (Outtake) – 8:54

Production/reissue credits

Musicians
 Jimmy Hamilton – Clarinet, Tenor Saxophone
 Johnny Hodges – Alto Saxophone
 Russell Procope – Clarinet, Alto Saxophone
 Paul Gonsalves – Tenor Saxophone
 Harry Carney – Bass Clarinet, Baritone Saxophone
 Cat Anderson – Trumpet
 Clark Terry – Trumpet
 Ray Nance – Trumpet
 Willie Cook – Trumpet
 Quentin Jackson – Trombone
 John Sanders – Trombone
 Britt Woodman – Trombone
 Jimmy Woode – Bass
 Duke Ellington – Piano
 Sam Woodyard – Drums
 Billy Strayhorn – Orchestration

Production
 Irving Townsend – Liner Notes, Original Recording Producer
 Phil Schaap – Liner Notes, Reissue Producer, Remastering, Research, Restoration. (No reissue retains Clark Terry's quotation, on the original LP release, of Puck's "Lord, what fools these mortals be!")
 Steven Berkowitz – A&R
 Darren Salmieri – A&R
 Mark Wilder – Digital Mastering
 Howard Fritzson – Art Direction
 Don Hunstein – Photography
 Randall Martin – Design
 Juliana Myrick – Package Manager

Critical reception 
NPR has included this album on their Basic Jazz Record Library. The Penguin Guide to Jazz gave the album 4 stars (out of a possible 4.) Allmusic gave the album 4.5 out of 5 stars.

References

Bibliography (further reading)

Contemporary reviews and journalism
 “Ellington Suite to Bow April 28” New York Times. 15 April 1957.
 Parmenter, Ross. “Music: Weill and the Duke.” New York Times 29 April 1957.
 “New Ellington Suite Hailed By Coast-to-Coast Audience.” Daily Defender.  2 July 1957.
 Wilson, John S. “Duke Bounces Back With Provocative Work.” New York Times. 13 Oct. 1957. esp 113
 Wilson, John S. “Jazz: Ellington.” New York Times 13 October 1957.

Historical and analytical writings (in reverse chronological order)
 Bradbury, David. Duke Ellington. London: Haus, 2005. Esp. pp. 91.
 Lanier, Douglas. “To Be-Bop or Not to Be-Bop; Minstrelsy, Jazz, Rap: Shakespeare, African American Music, and Cultural Legitimation.” Borrowers and Lenders: The Journal of Shakespeare and Appropriation Vol. 1, 2005 [no pagination].
 Buhler, Stephen M. “Form and Character in Duke Ellington’s and Billy Strayhorn’s Such Sweet Thunder.” Borrowers and Lenders: The Journal of Shakespeare and Appropriation Vol. 1, 2005 [no pagination].
 Nicholson, Stuart. Reminiscing in Tempo: A Portrait of Duke Ellington. Northeastern University Press, 1999, esp. pp. ???-???.
 Lambert, Eddie. Duke Ellington: A Listener’s Guide. Lanham, Md.: Scarecrow Press, 1999. Esp. pp. 193–194.
 Kernfeld, Barry. New Grove Dictionary of Jazz. St. Martin's Press, 1994. esp 331
 Hasse, John Edward. Beyond Category: The Life and Genius of Duke Ellington. New York: Simon and Schuster, 1993.
 Tucker, Mark. The Duke Ellington Reader. New York: Oxford University Press, 1993. Esp. pp. 321, 441.  esp.  pp. 339–341, 393
 Harrison, Max. “Max Harrison: Some Reflections on Ellington’s Longer Works. The Duke Ellington Reader. Tucker, Mark, ed. (esp. pg.393).
 Crouch, Stanley. “Stanley Crouch on Such Sweet Thunder, Suite Thursday, and Anatomy of a Murder.” The Duke Ellington Reader. Tucker, Mark, ed. (esp. 339, 441).
 Hasse, John. Beyond Category: The Life and Genius of Duke Ellington. New York: Simon & Schuster. 1993. Esp. pp. 331–333, 362.
 Timmer, W.E. Ellingtonia: The recorded music of Duke Ellington and his sidemen. Metuchen, N.J.: Institute of Jazz Studies: Scarecrow Press, 1988. Esp. pp. 450.
 Marsalis, Wynton. “What Jazz is and Isn’t.” New York Times. 31, July 1988.
 Ellington, Mercer. Duke Ellington in Person: An Intimate Memoir. Boston: Houghton Mifflin Co., 1978. Esp. pp. 117.
 Ellington, Duke. Music is My Mistress. New York: Da Capo Press, 1976, c1973. Esp. pp. 192.

Duke Ellington albums
1957 albums
Columbia Records albums
Albums produced by Irving Townsend
Legacy Recordings albums
Albums recorded at CBS 30th Street Studio
Music based on works by William Shakespeare